Luigi Viviani (Verona, 22 October 1937) is an Italian politician and trade unionist, actively involved in various national and local political activities and in the political fabric of Verona.

Biography 
During the 1980s Viviani was a member of the general secretariat of the Italian Confederation of Workers' Trade Unions during the secretariat of Pierre Carniti. In 1993 he co-founded the movement of the Social Christians with Ermanno Gorrieri, Pierre Carniti and other political exponents. He then became a senator of the Republic for two legislatures. During the 1996-2001 legislature he was Undersecretary for Labour with Minister Cesare Salvi; in the next legislature (2001-2006) he was vice-president of the Democrats of the Left group in the Senate.

References

External links 

1937 births
Living people
Democrats of the Left politicians
Italian trade unionists
Politicians from Verona
Senators of Legislature XIII of Italy
Senators of Legislature XIV of Italy
20th-century Italian politicians
21st-century Italian politicians